Angelos Efthymiou (born 18 January 1984) is a former Cypriot footballer who currently works as assistant manager for Pafos FC alongside Sofoklis Sofokleous.

Career
Efthymiou previously played for APOP Kinyras Peyias FC, Apollon Limassol, AEP Paphos. After failing to appear in any competitive matches for Apollon Limassol he moved to APOP Kinyras Peyias FC. On 17 May 2009 he celebrated winning the 2008–09 Cypriot Cup with APOP Kinyras Peyias FC, and he scored one of the goals in the final as they defeated AEL Limassol.

On May 22, 2009, he signed for AEL Limassol. In July 2010, he returned to Paphos to play for AEP Paphos F.C.

Honours
 Cypriot Cup: 2008–09

References

External links

1984 births
Living people
Cypriot footballers
AEP Paphos FC players
Apollon Limassol FC players
APOP Kinyras FC players
AEL Limassol players
AEK Kouklia F.C. players
Pafos FC players
Cypriot First Division players
Cypriot football managers
Akritas Chlorakas players
Association football midfielders